Beaver Township is a township in Roseau County, Minnesota, United States. The population was 103 at the 2000 census.

Beaver Township was named for the abundance of North American beavers formerly within its borders.

Geography

Demographics
As of the census of 2000, there were 103 people, 44 households, and 31 families residing in the township. The population density was 2.9 people per square mile (1.1/km2). There were 64 housing units at an average density of 1.8/sq mi (0.7/km2). The racial makeup of the township was 100.00% White.

There were 44 households, out of which 25.0% had children under the age of 18 living with them, 56.8% were married couples living together, 9.1% had a female householder with no husband present, and 27.3% were non-families. 22.7% of all households were made up of individuals, and 11.4% had someone living alone who was 65 years of age or older. The average household size was 2.34 and the average family size was 2.69.

In the township the population was spread out, with 18.4% under the age of 18, 5.8% from 18 to 24, 23.3% from 25 to 44, 28.2% from 45 to 64, and 24.3% who were 65 years of age or older. The median age was 46 years. For every 100 females, there were 151.2 males. For every 100 females age 18 and over, there were 147.1 males.

The median income for a household in the township was $46,250, and the median income for a family was $50,000. Males had a median income of $28,125 versus $25,625 for females. The per capita income for the township was $17,265. There were no families and 4.8% of the population living below the poverty line, including no under eighteens and 10.5% of those over 64.

References

Townships in Roseau County, Minnesota
Townships in Minnesota